Viktor Kurchenko (born 6 January 1965) is a Ukrainian archer. He competed in the men's individual and team events at the 2000 Summer Olympics.

References

1965 births
Living people
Ukrainian male archers
Olympic archers of Ukraine
Archers at the 2000 Summer Olympics
Place of birth missing (living people)